Mericle Rock is a nunatak in the middle of Campbell Glacier, approximately  from its head, in Victoria Land, Antarctica. It was mapped by the United States Geological Survey from surveys and U.S. Navy air photos, 1960–64, and was named by the Advisory Committee on Antarctic Names for David L. Mericle, U.S. Navy, an electronics technician at McMurdo Station, 1967.

Location
Mericle Rock is located in the center of Campbell Glacier in Victoria Land, Antarctica. Victoria Land is located in eastern Antarctica, with the Ross Sea to the east and Wilkes Land to the west. Victoria Land is located north of the Ross Ice Shelf. Sir James Clark Ross led the expedition who discovered the region in 1841, naming it after Queen Victoria.

Campbell Glacier is about 60 miles long and begins near the south end of the Mesa Range. It drains southeast between Deep Freeze Range and Mount Melbourne to discharge in north Terra Nova Bay. The Northern Party, led by Lieutenant Victor L.A. Campbell, observed the lower end of the glacier. The glacier was named for the leader, who worked for the Royal Navy from 1910 to 1913.

Geography
Nunataks are small rock areas that emerge above glaciers and ice sheets. Because they are typically isolated from the main mountains, they are often easier to access. Nunataks were first described in Greenland. Nunatak means "lonely peak" in Inuktitut. Due to their sterile surroundings and isolation, nunataks are rarely or never visited.

The land area on and surrounding Mericle Rock is not cultivated. The vegetation natural to the area is mainly still intact.

Mericle Rock is a Summit. The estimated terrain elevation above sea level of Mericle Rock is 1,836 meters (6,023 feet, 7 15/32 inches).

Antarctica is Earth's highest continent. The average elevation is 2,500 meters (8,200 feet).  The South Pole elevation is 2,835 meters (9,300 feet). The highest peak in Antarctica is 4,882 meters (16,050 feet).

Weather
On average, the month with the most sunshine on Mericle Rock is September. There is no other distinct peak month for rainfall or other precipitation.

David L. Mericle
The Advisory Committee on Antarctic Names named Mericle Rock after David L. Mericle. Mericle was an electronics technician who worked for the U.S. Navy. He was stationed at the McMurdo Station in 1967.

The Mericle name was first found in Normandy, France. The first settlers of this family name or variation of this name were Bastian Merree who in 1727 settled in Philadelphia; Father Demers who lived in Quebec in 1848; and Dominique Lamer who in 1848 settled in Atlanta.

References

Nunataks of Victoria Land
Scott Coast